This list of mammals of Idaho includes all wild mammal species indigenous to the U.S. state of Idaho. Five mammal species introduced in the state include the eastern gray squirrel, Virginia opossum, house mouse, black rat, and the Norway rat. Mammals included in this list are drawn from the Idaho Department of Fish and Game.

Eulipotyphla

Shrews
Family: Soricidae
Masked shrew, Sorex cinereus
American pygmy shrew, Sorex hoyi
Merriam's shrew, Sorex merriami
Montane shrew, Sorex monticolus
Dwarf shrew, Sorex nanus
American water shrew, Sorex palustris
Vagrant shrew, Sorex vagrans

Moles
Family: Talpidae
Coast mole, Scapanus orarius

Didelphimorphia

Opossums
Family: Didelphidae
Virginia opossum, Didelphis virginiana

Rodents

Beavers
Family: Castoridae
North American beaver, Castor canadensis

Pocket gophers
Family: Geomyidae
Idaho pocket gopher, Thomomys idahoensis
Northern pocket gopher, Thomomys talpoides
Townsend's pocket gopher, Thomomys townsendii

Kangaroo rats and pocket mice
Family: Heteromyidae
Chisel-toothed kangaroo rat, Dipodomys microps
Ord's kangaroo rat, Dipodomys ordii
Little pocket mouse, Perognathus longimembris
Great Basin pocket mouse, Perognathus merriami

Porcupines
Family: Erethizontidae
North American porcupine, Erethizon dorsatum

Jumping mice
Family: Dipodidae
Western jumping mouse, Zapus princeps

New World rats, mice, and voles
Family: Cricetidae
Sagebrush vole, Lemmiscus curtatus
Long-tailed vole, Microtus longicaudus
Montane vole, Microtus montanus
Prairie vole, Microtus ochrogaster
Meadow vole, Microtus pennsylvanicus
Water vole, Microtus richardsoni
Southern red-backed vole, Myodes gapperii
Bushy-tailed woodrat, Neotoma cinerea
Desert woodrat, Neotoma lepida
Southern plains woodrat, Neotoma micropus
Muskrat, Ondatra zibethicus
Northern grasshopper mouse, Onychomys leucogaster
Brush mouse, Peromyscus boylii
Canyon mouse, Peromyscus crinitus
White-footed mouse, Peromyscus leucopus
Northern rock mouse, Peromyscus nasutus
Western deer mouse, Peromyscus sonoriensis
Pinyon mouse, Peromyscus truei
Western heather vole, Phenacomys intermedius
Western harvest mouse, Reithrodontomys megalotis
Northern bog lemming, Synaptomys borealis

Old World rats, mice
Family: Muridae
 House mouse, Mus musculus introduced
 Norway rat, Rattus norvegicus introduced
 Black rat, Rattus rattus introduced

Chipmunks, marmots, squirrels
Family: Sciuridae
White-tailed antelope squirrel, Ammospermophilus leucurus
Golden-mantled ground squirrel, Callospermophilus lateralis
Northern flying squirrel, Glaucomys sabrinus
Hoary marmot, Marmota caligata
Yellow-bellied marmot, Marmota flaviventris
Rock squirrel, Otospermophilus variegatus
Yellow-pine chipmunk, Neotamias amoenus
Cliff chipmunk, Neotamias dorsalis
Least chipmunk, Neotamias minimus
Red-tailed chipmunk, Neotamias ruficaudus
Hopi chipmunk, Neotamias rufus
Uinta chipmunk, Neotamias umbrinus
Eastern gray squirrel, Sciurus carolinensis introduced
Fox squirrel, Sciurus niger introduced
American red squirrel, Tamiasciurus hudsonicus
Uinta ground squirrel, Urocitellus armatus
Belding's ground squirrel, Urocitellus beldingi
Northern Idaho ground squirrel, Urocitellus brunneus
Merriam's ground squirrel, Urocitellus canus
Columbian ground squirrel, Urocitellus columbianus
Wyoming ground squirrel, Urocitellus elegans
Southern Idaho ground squirrel, Urocitellus endemicus
Piute ground squirrel, Urocitellus mollus

Lagomorpha

Hares and rabbits
Family: Leporidae
Pygmy rabbit, Brachylagus idahodensis
Snowshoe hare, Lepus americanus
Black-tailed jackrabbit, Lepus californicus
White-tailed jackrabbit, Lepus townsendii
Mountain cottontail, Sylvilagus nuttallii

Pikas
Family: Ochotonidae
American pika, Ochotona princeps

Chiroptera

Vesper bats
Family: Vespertilionidae
Pallid bat, Antrozous pallidus
Townsend's big-eared bat, Corynorhinus townsendii
Big brown bat, Eptesicus fuscus
Spotted bat, Euderma maculatum
Silver-haired bat, Lasionycteris noctivagans
Eastern red bat, Lasiurus borealis
Hoary bat, Lasiurus cinereus
California myotis, Myotis californicus
Western small-footed myotis, Myotis ciliolabrum
Long-eared myotis, Myotis evotis
Little brown bat, Myotis lucifugus
Fringed myotis, Myotis thysanodes
Long-legged myotis, Myotis volans
Yuma myotis, Myotis yumanensis
Western pipistrelle, Parastrellus hesperus

Free-tailed bats
Family: Molossidae
Big free-tailed bat, Nyctinomops macrotis
Mexican free-tailed bat, Tadarida brasiliensis

Carnivora

Cats
Family: Felidae
Canada lynx, Lynx canadensis 
Bobcat, Lynx rufus
Cougar, Puma concolor

Canines
Family: Canidae
Coyote, Canis latrans
Gray wolf, Canis lupus reintroduced
Northern Rocky Mountain wolf, C. l. irremotus extirpated
Northwestern wolf, C. l. occidentalis introduced
Southern Rocky Mountain wolf, C. l. youngi extinct 
Gray fox, Urocyon cinereoargenteus
Kit fox, Vulpes macrotis
Red fox, Vulpes vulpes

Bears
Family: Ursidae
American black bear, Ursus americanus
Brown bear, Ursus arctos
Grizzly bear, U. a. horribilis

Skunks
Family: Mephitidae
Striped skunk, Mephitis mephitis
Western spotted skunk, Spilogale gracilis

Weasels
Family: Mustelidae
Wolverine, Gulo gulo
North American river otter, Lontra canadensis
Pacific marten, Martes caurina
Black-footed ferret, Mustela nigripes extirpated
American ermine, Mustela richardsonii
Long-tailed weasel, Neogale frenata
American mink, Neogale vison
Fisher, Pekania pennanti
American badger, Taxidea taxus

Raccoons
Family: Procyonidae
Ringtail, Bassariscus astutus
Raccoon, Procyon lotor

Artiodactyla

Pronghorns
Family: Antilocapridae
Pronghorn, Antilocapra americana

Deer
Family: Cervidae
Moose, Alces alces
Elk, Cervus canadensis
Rocky Mountain elk, C. c. nelsoni
Mule deer, Odocoileus hemionus
White-tailed deer, Odocoileus virginianus
Caribou, Rangifer tarandus extirpated
Boreal woodland caribou, R. t. caribou extirpated

Bovids
Family: Bovidae
American bison, Bison bison 
Mountain goat, Oreamnos americanus
Bighorn sheep, Ovis canadensis

See also
List of regional mammals lists
List of prehistoric mammals
Mammal classification

References

Idaho